Smithfield is a town in Isle of Wight County, in the South Hampton Roads subregion of the Hampton Roads region of Virginia in the United States.  The population was 8,089 at the 2010 census.

The town is most famous for the curing and production of the Smithfield ham. The Virginia General Assembly passed a statute defining "Smithfield ham" by law in 1926, with one of the requirements that it be processed within the town limits. Smithfield Foods, a Chinese Fortune 500 company that owns Smithfield Packing Company and others, is the world's largest pork processor and hog producer. The company, based in Smithfield, raises 12 million hogs and processes 20 million pounds of them annually.

History and industry
Smithfield, first colonized in 1634, is located on the Pagan River, south of Jamestown and on the south side of the James River. The Native Americans knew this area as Warascoyak, also spelled Warrosquoyacke, meaning "point of land."

The Virginia colony officially formed Warrosquyoake Shire (with numerous variant spellings, including Warrascoyack, Warrascocke and "Warwick Squeak") in 1634, but it had already been known as "Warascoyack County" before this. It was renamed as Isle of Wight County in 1637.

In 1730, the Tobacco Inspection Act of 1730 established "Warricksqueak Bay, in Isle of Wight County" as the site of an official tobacco inspection house.

The town was established as a seaport in 1752 by Arthur Smith IV. The original survey and plat of the Town of Smithfield was made by Jordan Thomas, County Surveyor, for "Captain Arthur Smith" in 1750.

As a river town, its life and growth were dependent on the river. "Wharf Hill" was the waterfront location of the beginning of the industries of Smithfield. They eventually included peanuts and the raising of pork as commodities, leading to the city claiming the titles of "Peanut Capital of the World" and "Ham Capital of the World."

George Purdie, a County Justice and Postmaster of Smithfield during his lifetime, in 1763 purchased Lots 4 and 5 of the original plat of the Town of Smithfield. Purdie's neighbor, Captain Mallory Todd, developed the business of curing and shipping the hams that has made Smithfield world-famous. The peanut industry continued until the fire of 1921, which destroyed the peanut warehouses. The peanut trade moved to the nearby railroad hub of Suffolk, Virginia.

Military actions of both the Revolutionary and Civil War took place in and around the town, as it was considered strategic due to its proximity to the James River. Revolutionary Patriots used Wharf Hill as a safe harbor for receiving arms and supplies, and a vantage point for directing Federal cannon fire on Main Street. Its dock has welcomed the fictional drama of the real "Show Boat" (James Adams Floating Theatre).

The Mansion on Main was the showplace home of a Victorian-era "Virginian of Virginians", Richard Samuel "R.S." Thomas (1837–1915). It was restored by Sala Clark in the late 1990s. His 1889 "urban" Queen Ann-style mansion changed the face of Smithfield (which had been dominated by colonial and cottage styles). Thomas helped to preserve the 1632 St. Luke's Church, which in the late 20th century was recognized as a National Historic Landmark. Thomas literally "wrote the book" on St. Luke's Church, The Old Brick Church Near Smithfield, Virginia, specifically to champion recognition of its 1632 date of construction and legacy. He presented his work to the Virginia Historical Society on December 22, 1891.

He wrote: "It is my object to prove that this Church was built in 1632, and I shall prove it, 1. By the existence at that early date, of such strong, religious sentiment, as demanded a house of worship to the living God; 2. By tradition; 3. By lately existing records; and – 4. By the bricks and mortar of the Church itself."

Today, Smithfield has a population of 8,100. The ham production operation was purchased by a Chinese firm in 2014.

Geography
Smithfield is located at  (36.978767, -76.618578).

According to the United States Census Bureau, the town has a total area of 10.4 square miles (27.1 km2), of which 9.5 square miles (24.7 km2) is land and 0.9 square miles (2.4 km2) (8.80%) is water.

Demographics

As of the census of 2010, there were 8,089 people, 2,438 households (2000 census), and 1,830 families residing in the town. The population density is 851.5 people per square mile (330.2/km2). In 2000 there were 2,552 housing units at an average density of 267.9 per square mile (103.4/km2). The racial makeup of the town was 67.22% White, 30.87% African American, 0.35% Native American, 0.41% Asian, 0.02% Pacific Islander, 0.22% from other races, and 0.92% from two or more races. Hispanic or Latino of any race were 0.93% of the population.

There were 2,438 households, out of which 37.1% had children under the age of 18 living with them, 53.2% were married couples living together, 17.8% had a female householder with no husband present, and 24.9% were non-families. 21.5% of all households were made up of individuals, and 9.7% had someone living alone who was 65 years of age or older. The average household size was 2.55 and the average family size was 2.95.

In the town, the population was spread out, with 27.0% under the age of 18, 7.0% from 18 to 24, 29.3% from 25 to 44, 23.1% from 45 to 64, and 13.6% who were 65 years of age or older. The median age was 38 years. For every 100 females, there were 89.3 males. For every 100 females age 18 and over, there were 82.4 males.

The median income for a household in the town was $43,224, and the median income for a family was $53,906. Males had a median income of $40,845 versus $24,419 for females. The per capita income for the town was $19,301. About 11.8% of families and 12.0% of the population were below the poverty line, including 12.7% of those under the age of 18 and 15.6% of those 65 and older.

Culture and architecture

Known as the ham capital of the world, Smithfield currently attracts many tourists. Smithfield's Historic District is a major attraction, with more than 70 contributing properties from the Colonial, Federal, and Victorian periods. Historic buildings that lure tourists include the Isle of Wight County Museum, Historic Fort Huger, the Schoolhouse Museum, the Old Courthouse of 1750, and St. Luke's Church, a National Historic Landmark located just outside downtown. Other sites of historic interest include the former colonial tavern, now the Smithfield Inn; the Wentworth-Grinnan House, and Windsor Castle Park.

Countryside attractions just outside Smithfield include Boykin's Tavern Museum, the 1800 Isle of Wight Courthouse, and Darden's Country Store & Smokehouse. The Jamestown/Scotland Ferry (located in Surry) allows tourists to visit Williamsburg, Virginia, as well, linking Smithfield to the historic triangle. Smithfield is a convenient day trip from Norfolk, Richmond, and Virginia Beach.

The Fort Boykin Archaeological Site (44IW20), Four Square, P. D. Gwaltney Jr. House, Ivy Hill Cemetery, Col. Josiah Parker Family Cemetery, Poplar Hill, Robert Tynes House, and Wolftrap Farm are listed on the National Register of Historic Places.

Smithfield offers an array of events throughout the year. Family events include the Christmas Parade, the Smithfield Farmers Market, and Smithfield Olden Days. Local businesses and restaurants also offer entertainment. Jalapeños and Smithfield Station offer live music, while the Smithfield Little Theater offers various selections of plays throughout the year.

Windsor Castle Park, Nike Park, Cypress Creek Golf Course, and Smithfield Station Restaurant, Waterfront Inn & Marina are some recreational sites of Smithfield. Boating, fishing, hunting, and biking are enjoyed, and the city has a local skate park, trails, and campgrounds.

Gallery

Schools
 Carrollton Elementary School (PreK-3rd)
 Hardy Elementary School (PreK-4th)
 Westside Elementary School (4th-6th)
 Smithfield Middle School (7th-8th)
 Smithfield High School (9th-12th)

References

External links

 Official Website of Smithfield

Towns in Isle of Wight County, Virginia
1634 establishments in Virginia
Populated places established in 1634
Populated places on the James River (Virginia)